John Joseph McMahon   (April 22, 1875 – September 8, 1958) was an American architect who even today remains highly regarded for his churches, schools and other buildings for Catholic clients in Connecticut, especially Hartford and New Haven.

Early life and architectural training 
McMahon was born April 22, 1875, in Hartford, Connecticut, where he would live for the rest of his life. He studied as a boy at St. Patrick School where one of his classmates, John F. Callahan, would later become a Catholic priest and one of McMahon's clients. He left school a few months before graduation in 1890 and took a job as an errand boy.

Three years later he was hired by the architectural firm of Frederick R. Comstock as an apprentice.  He worked both in Hartford and New York City. His most notable project was the 1899 Second Church of Christ Scientist, located at 68th Street and Central Park West, New York City. His architectural training was cut short when he enlisted in the Connecticut National Guard to take part in the Spanish–American War. Eventually McMahon attained the rank of colonel and was henceforth known, professionally and otherwise, as "the Colonel".

Architectural practice 
In 1900 McMahon became associate architect of the Hartford, CT firm J. J. Dwyer & J. J. McMahon, with John J. Dwyer. He remained in this position until 1911 when he entered into a long partnership with Frank Warren Whiton, forming the firm of Whiton and McMahon. They continued together until 1932 when the practice was dissolved due to the economic depression. After that McMahon practiced under his own name and briefly with architect Russell Hills.

Works include

J. J. Dwyer and J. J. McMahon 
 Mount Saint Joseph Academy, West Hartford, Connecticut
 St. Michael Church, Hartford, Connecticut
 St. Augustine Church, Hartford, Connecticut (basement only)
 St. Joseph Church, Danbury, Connecticut
 St. Mary Church, Simsbury, Connecticut (this church has since been replaced)
 St, Mary Church, Branford, Connecticut (this church has since been replaced)
 St. Patrick Church, Bridgeport, Connecticut (superstructure only, built on a basement church by James Murphy
 St. Francis Hospital Hartford, Connecticut (administration building)
 Elks Club Lodge, Hartford, Connecticut
 St. Teresa Church, Woodbury, Connecticut
 St Mary's Home for the Aged, West Hartford, Connecticut
 St. Peter's Parochial School, Hartford, CT
 St. John's School for Boys, Deep River, CT
 St. John's Parochial School, Watertown, CT
 St. Joseph's Novitiate, West Hartford, CT

Whiton and McMahon 

 St. Luke Church, Hartford, Connecticut (basement church, later completed by another unknown architect)
 St. Justin Church, Hartford, Connecticut
 St. Augustine Church, Hartford, Connecticut (superstructure, school and rectory)
 St. Paul Church, Glastonbury, Connecticut
 St. Lawrence O'Toole Church, Hartford, Connecticut (with Russell Hills)
 St. John of the Cross Church, Middlebury, Connecticut
 St. Brendan Church, New Haven, Connecticut
 St. Rose of Lima Church, New Haven, Connecticut
 St. Bernard Church, Sharon, Connecticut
 St. Peter Church, Hartford, Connecticut (new towers)
 St. Gabriel Church, Windsor, Connecticut
 * St. Mary Chapel, Newington, Connecticut (this church has since been replaced)
 Most Holy Trinity Church, Hartford, Connecticut
 St. Thomas the Apostle Church, West Hartford, Connecticut
 Wilson St. School, Hartford CT
 Arsenal School, Hartford CT
 Alfred E. Burr School, Hartford CT
 St James Parochial School, Manchester, CT
 Washington St. School additions, Hartford CT
 Richard J. Kinsella School, (now the Betances School), Hartford CT
 Dr. James H Naylor School, Hartford, CT
 Moylan (Hillside Ave)School, Hartford, CT

John J. McMahon 
 Corpus Christi Church, Wethersfield, Connecticut
 St Peter and Paul Church, Norwich, Connecticut
 St. Thomas the Apostle Church (superstructure), School and rectory, West Hartford, Connecticut

References

Reading 

Architects of Roman Catholic churches
Architects from Hartford, Connecticut
1875 births
1958 deaths
American ecclesiastical architects